The Lafayette Leopards men's basketball team represents Lafayette College in Easton, Pennsylvania in NCAA Division I competition. The school's team competes in the Patriot League and plays home games in Kirby Sports Center. Fran O'Hanlon is the winningest coach in program history. The Leopards are currently coached by Mike Jordan since his appointment on March 29, 2022. He is unrelated to former NBA player Michael Jordan.

Postseason results

NCAA tournament results
The Leopards have appeared in four NCAA Tournaments. Their combined record is 0–5.

NIT results
The Leopards have appeared in five National Invitation Tournaments. Their combined record is 1–5.

Notable alumni

Conference players of the year
 East Coast Conference POY
 Henry Horne (1975)
 Todd Tripucka (1976)
 Patriot League POY
 Stefan Ciosici (1998)
 Brian Ehlers (1999, 2000)

References

External links